Northwood is a community encompassing the northern portions of the city of Irvine, in Orange County, California. It covers the area enclosed by the Santa Ana Freeway, Culver Drive, Portola Parkway and Jeffrey Road.

History
Northwood, which began construction in the early 1970s, is the only community in Irvine that was developed independently of the Irvine Company. Therefore, it's the only community that is not completely governed by any homeowners' association.  Neighborhoods like Park Paseo, Park Place, and Woodside do have homeowners' associations, as well as community pools and jacuzzis. Park Place and Park Paseo share a clubhouse as well.

The area that is now Northwood started off as part of the Irvine Ranch. The Irvine family gave or sold parcels of the area as bonuses and gifts to ranch foremen and other employees. Some 23 chunks of land were held by different owners, who were organized by a single developer who named the area Northwood. More than 60 percent of the homes in Northwood were built between 1977 and 1979 - at one point there were 66 models across 18 tracts on sale simultaneously.

Another community called Northwood Pointe was developed in the late 1990s by The Irvine Company as a companion neighborhood to Northwood.

Like most of Irvine's villages, Northwood is known for certain unique characteristics, the most prominent of which are the eucalyptus windrows that enclose neighborhoods and line main thoroughfares, and include many of the trees that were planted when the land was farmed, as crop protection against fierce Santa Ana Winds. These windrows are more frequent and closer together in the Northwood area than in other parts of Irvine. Also characteristic of the village are views of the Santa Ana Mountains to the north and a preponderance of single-family dwellings often situated on somewhat larger lots.  The "Northwood Loop" pre-dates the "Yale Loop" in the village of Woodbridge and serves as a two-lane neighborhood road through the older part of Northwood, with four segments Northwood, Southwood, Eastwood, and Westwood, bisected North-South and East-West by Yale and Bryan Avenues, respectively.

Demographics

Parks
Following are the parks located in Northwood:
 Blue Gum Park
 Brywood Park
 Carrotwood Park
 Coralwood Park
 Meadowood Park
 Northwood Community Park
 Northwood Gratitude and Honor Memorial
 Pepperwood Park
 Pinewood Park
 Settlers Park
 Silkwood Park
 Sycamore Park

Because the schools in Irvine are not gated, Elementary Schools serve as parks for neighborhoods as well.

Education
Northwood is within the Irvine Unified School District. Santiago Hills Elementary School, Canyon View Elementary School, Brywood Elementary School, and Northwood Elementary School are all successful elementary schools in Northwood. On the 2007 Academic Performance Index Base Report, the primary schools received scores ranging from 889 to 951, out of a possible 1,000. Northwood Elementary was named a National Blue Ribbon School for 2008.

Sierra Vista Middle School serves as the Middle School in Northwood. It scored 922 in the 2007 Academic Performance Index Base Report. 

Northwood High School was included in Newsweek's list of top high schools and has won several Grammy Signature awards, including the Gold School Award. Most students living north of Trabuco Road and west of Jeffrey Road attend Northwood High School, which scored 863.

Shopping Center
The following shopping centers are located in the community:

 Northwood Town Center
 Cypress Village Shopping Center (formerly Trabuco Plaza)
 Orchard Hills Shopping Center
 Northpark Plaza Shopping Center

References

Villages of Irvine, California